Chelsea Chenault (born October 19, 1994) is an American swimmer who specializes in middle-distance freestyle events.  Chenault has been a member of the U.S. national team, winning gold medals as a member of the U.S. teams in the 4x200-meter freestyle relay events at the 2012 and 2013 FINA world championships.

She is also a 2015 World Champion of the 800 free relay.

References

External links
 
 
 

1994 births
Living people
American female freestyle swimmers
USC Trojans women's swimmers
Sportspeople from Walnut Creek, California
World Aquatics Championships medalists in swimming
Medalists at the FINA World Swimming Championships (25 m)
Universiade medalists in swimming
Universiade gold medalists for the United States
Medalists at the 2013 Summer Universiade
Medalists at the 2015 Summer Universiade